Melania Cristina Catalla (born December 25, 1950 — disappeared on July 31, 1977) was an anti-martial law activist who belonged to a network of community organizations in the Southern Tagalog region in the Philippines whose disappearance on July 31, 1977, became a rallying cry of the Philippine resistance against the Marcos dictatorship.

Catalla's name is inscribed on the Wall of Remembrance at the Bantayog ng mga Bayani, a memorial that  honors martyrs and heroes who fought the dictatorship.  She is also one of the heroes honored by the University of the Philippines Los Baños on its 'Hagdan ng Malayang Kamalayan' memorial.

See also 
 Bantayog ng mga Bayani
 List of people who disappeared
 Southern Tagalog 10

References 

1954 births
1970s missing person cases
Enforced disappearances in the Philippines
History of the Philippines (1965–1986)
Individuals honored at the Bantayog ng mga Bayani
Marcos martial law victims
Martial law under Ferdinand Marcos
Missing person cases in the Philippines
Political repression in the Philippines
Presidency of Ferdinand Marcos
Southern Tagalog 10
University of the Philippines Los Baños
University of the Philippines Los Baños people honored at the Bantayog ng mga Bayani
Year of death uncertain